The Hungarian Chess Federation ( - MSSz) is the national organization for chess in Hungary. It is affiliated to the World Chess Federation and was founded in 1921. The chairman is Miklós Seszták. The Hungarian Chess Federation organizes a Hungarian Chess Championship.

Hungary hosted the 2nd unofficial Chess Olympiad.

Organization  
The board consists of a chairman, a deputy chairman, a secretary and a treasurer. 
The chairman and the deputy chairman are elected for a 4-year term.

Officers 
 chairman : Miklós Seszták
 secretary : Attila Mészáros

Hungarian chess players 
 Péter Lékó, international grandmaster
 Judit Polgar
Richárd Rapport
Zoltán Almási
Ferenc Berkes

External links 
  
 

National members of the European Chess Union
Chess in Hungary
Chess
1921 establishments in Hungary
Sports organizations established in 1921
Chess organizations
1921 in chess